Spar or Spar may refer to:

Common meanings
 Spar (sailing), part of a sailing vessel
 Spar (aeronautics), part of an aircraft
 Spar, engage in sparring, mock combat

In business
 SPAR (retailer), a multinational retailer
 Spar Aerospace, a former Canadian aerospace company
 Spar grocery stores, owned by Pisiffik, Greenland
 NASDAQ symbol for Spartan Motors, US

Vessels
 USCGC Spar (WLB-403), a former United States Coast Guard seagoing buoy tender
 USCGC Spar (WLB-206), a United States Coast Guard seagoing buoy tender

SPAR or SPARS
 SPARS, the United States Coast Guard Women's Reserve
 Society of Professional Audio Recording Services
 Special Program of Assisted Reproduction

Other uses
 Spar (mineralogy), a crystal with readily discernible faces
 Spar (platform), a type of floating oil platform
 Spar (tree), part of a cable logging setup
 Spar Island (Rhode Island), a sandbar
 "Spar" (short story), by Kij Johnson
 Debora Spar

See also
 
 
 SPARS code, a code on some compact disc recordings